General Cullen may refer to:

David Mark Cullen (fl. 1980s–2010s), British Army major general
James P. Cullen (1945–2017), U.S. Army brigadier general
Paul Cullen (general) (1909–2007), Australian Army major general

See also
Frank L. Culin Jr. (1892–1967), U.S. Army major general
Attorney General Cullen (disambiguation)